Pseudophoenix lediniana is a palm species endemic to the Tiburon Peninsula in southwestern Haiti.  It is a medium-sized tree, 10–20 metres tall, with pinnately compound leaves and solitary stems slightly swollen at the base.

Pseudophoenix lediniana is rare in the wild.  The species was described and named by Robert William Read. This palm is named after Dr. R. Bruce Ledin, one of the founders of The Palm Society in Florida.

References

lediniana
Trees of Haiti
Endemic flora of Haiti
Critically endangered plants